Taiwan is Good (traditional Chinese: 台灣好) is a patriotic song of the Republic of China (ROC), which its tune was originally from the indigenous songs of Amis people and Paiwan people in Taitung County area. It is about the ROC government and people's desire to retake Mainland China from the Chinese Communist forces. It also celebrates the development of modern Taiwan, which is considered one province of the whole ROC. This is also one of the very few ROC political songs that used Taiwan as main themes.

Lyrics

References

External links
 Teresa Teng performing "Taiwan Is Good" in 1994

Mandarin-language songs
Chinese patriotic songs
Songs about China
Song articles with missing songwriters
Year of song missing